The Glass Castle is a 2017 American biographical drama film directed by Destin Daniel Cretton and written by Cretton, Andrew Lanham, and Marti Noxon. It is based on Jeannette Walls' 2005 best-selling memoir of the same name. Depicting Walls' childhood,  where her family lived in poverty and sometimes as squatters, the film stars Brie Larson as Walls, with Naomi Watts, Woody Harrelson, Max Greenfield, and Sarah Snook in supporting roles.

The Glass Castle was released on August 11, 2017, by Lionsgate and received mixed reviews from critics. They praised the performances of its cast, particularly Larson, but criticized the emotional tones and adaptation. The film grossed $22 million in North America.

Plot
As a child, Jeannette Walls lives a nomadic life with her painter mother Rose, her intelligent but irresponsible father Rex, older sister Lori, and younger brother Brian. While cooking unsupervised, Jeannette is severely burned. At the hospital, a doctor and social worker question her home life, but Rex distracts the staff and escapes with Jeannette. The family leaves town, and Jeannette is enchanted by Rex’s plans for the family’s dream house, a glass castle.

The family soon includes Jeannette’s infant sister Maureen, and remains on the move for years, eventually relocating to a dilapidated house in Utah. Jeannette nearly drowns when a drunk Rex aggressively teaches her to swim. He assaults the lifeguard, forcing the family – now pursued by the law and with no money – to go to Welch, West Virginia, where the children meet their grandparents and uncle Stanley. Rex moves his family into a ramshackle house in the wilderness, living without running water, gas, or electricity. When the family has not eaten in days, Rex takes their remaining money to buy food, but returns home drunk after a fight. Sewing up his wound, Jeannette asks him to stop drinking, and Rex ties himself to his bed, successfully enduring withdrawal. He lands a job as a construction worker and the family enjoys a comfortable Christmas.

The parents attend the funeral of Rose’s mother in Texas, leaving the children with their grandparents in Welch. The sisters discover Erma sexually assaulting Brian and attack her, but are pulled away by Stanley. When their parents return, Rex refuses to listen to his children about the incident. The family returns home and he resumes drinking, leading to a violent altercation with Rose. Jeannette is unable to convince her mother to leave Rex, and the siblings promise to care for each other and escape their poverty.

As a teenager, Jeannette is drawn to journalism. The siblings have now saved enough money for Lori to leave for New York City, infuriating Rex; Jeannette prepares to do the same. Erma dies, and after the funeral, Jeannette is pulled into her father’s scheme to hustle his acquaintance Robbie at pool. He loses to Rex and unwittingly reveals Jeannette’s plan to move to New York City. She accompanies Robbie upstairs and he attempts to rape her, but she shows her scars from her childhood burns and leaves. At home, she discovers her father has stolen her savings, but escapes from home anyway. Attending college in New York City, Jeannette faces financial difficulties and prepares to drop out, but Rex arrives with a pile of gambling winnings, telling her to follow her dreams.

By 1989, Jeannette is a gossip columnist for New York magazine and engaged to marry David, a financial analyst. At dinner with a client of David’s, Jeannette lies about her parents. On the way home, she sees her now-homeless parents dumpster diving. She later meets with her mother, who is dismissive of her engagement. Jeannette and David visit her family at the abandoned building where her parents are squatting. Brian, now a police officer, and Lori live comfortably, but Maureen has moved in with their parents. Rex and David drunkenly arm wrestle and David wins, but Rex punches him in the nose anyway. Returning home, David tells Jeannette that he wants nothing more to do with her parents.

Maureen calls Jeannette to explain that she is moving to California. At her engagement party, Jeannette discovers that her parents have owned valuable land – now worth almost $1 million – since she was a child, but chose never to sell. Furious at Rex’s refusal to admit to the pain he caused his family, Jeannette bans him from her life. Some time later, Jeannette is unhappily married to David. Rose reaches out to tell her Rex is dying, but Jeannette refuses to see him. At dinner with another of David’s clients, Jeannette finds the courage to reveal the truth about her parents. She races to her father, and they reconcile before he dies. The following Thanksgiving, Jeannette – now a freelance writer living alone – celebrates with her family, reminiscing about Rex’s unconventional life.

Cast
 Brie Larson as Jeannette Walls
 Chandler Head as Jeannette Walls (age 8)
 Ella Anderson as Jeannette Walls (age 11)
 Naomi Watts as Rose Mary Walls
 Woody Harrelson as Rex Walls
 Sarah Snook as Lori Walls
 Olivia Kate Rice as Lori Walls (age 10)
 Sadie Sink as Lori Walls (age 13)
 Josh Caras as Brian Walls
 Iain Armitage as Brian Walls (age 6)
 Charlie Shotwell as Brian Walls (age 9)
 Brigette Lundy-Paine as Maureen Walls
 Charlie and Noemie Guyon as Baby Maureen Walls
 Eden Grace Redfield as three-year-old Maureen Walls
 Shree Crooks as Young Maureen Walls
 Max Greenfield as David
 Dominic Bogart as Robbie
 Joe Pingue as Uncle Stanley
 Robin Bartlett as Erma

Production
In April 2012, Lionsgate was reported to have acquired the rights to the book and Jennifer Lawrence was in talks to star in the film. In October 2013, it was noted that director Destin Daniel Cretton was in talks to direct the film and re-write the screenplay with Andrew Lanham from a previous draft by Marti Noxon. In October 2015, Brie Larson joined the cast of the film, replacing Lawrence; she had exited the film after a prolonged search for a male lead. In November 2015, Woody Harrelson joined the cast of the film as the father. In March 2016, Naomi Watts joined the cast as the mother. In April 2016, Max Greenfield and Sarah Snook joined the cast. In May 2016, Ella Anderson joined the cast.

Principal photography began on May 20, 2016, in Welch, West Virginia.

Release 
The Glass Castle was released on August 11, 2017, by Lionsgate.

Box office
The Glass Castle grossed $22 million in the United States and Canada.

In North America, The Glass Castle was released alongside The Nut Job 2: Nutty by Nature and Annabelle: Creation, and was projected to gross around $5 million from 1,461 theaters in its opening weekend. The film made $1.7 million on its first day and $4.7 million over the weekend, finishing 9th at the box office. The film made $2.6 million in its second weekend (a drop of 45.5%), finishing 12th.

Critical response

On review aggregation website Rotten Tomatoes, the film has an approval rating of 52% based on 164 reviews, and an average rating of 6/10. The website's critical consensus reads, "The Glass Castle has an affecting real-life story and an outstanding performance by Brie Larson, but these aren't enough to outweigh a fundamentally misguided approach to the material." On Metacritic, the film has a weighted average score 56 out of 100, based on reviews from 39 critics, indicating "mixed or average reviews". Audiences polled by CinemaScore gave the film an average grade of "A−" on an A+ to F scale.

Writing for Rolling Stone, Peter Travers said the film "peddles easy uplift instead of cold, hard truths" and gave it two stars out of four, saying, "Hollywood has a knack for sanitizing books that deserve better. In the case of The Glass Castle, it's a damn shame." Richard Roeper of Chicago Sun-Times also gave the film two out of four stars and was equally critical for its presentation, writing: "...a film that presents overwhelming evidence of Rex and Rose Mary as appalling human beings for 90 percent of the journey, and then asks us to give them a break? No sale."

References

External links
 

2017 drama films
2017 biographical drama films
2010s English-language films
American biographical drama films
Films based on American novels
Films based on autobiographies
Films about poverty in the United States
Biographical films about journalists
Biographical films about writers
Drama films based on actual events
Films directed by Destin Daniel Cretton
Films scored by Joel P. West
Films shot in West Virginia
Films with screenplays by Destin Daniel Cretton
Films with screenplays by Andrew Lanham
Films with screenplays by Marti Noxon
Lionsgate films
Squatting in film
2010s American films